The Montclair Open was a tennis tournament first established in 1882 at Montclair, New Jersey, United States that ran until 1892.

History
The Montclair Open was a tennis tournament first established in 1882 by the Montclair Lawn Tennis Club (formally incorporated in 1885), Montclair, New Jersey, United States. The tournament ran until 1892. In 1893 the tennis clubs land was given over to redevelopment thus ending the tournament.

Notable winners of the mens singles title included; Henry Slocum, Howard Augustus Taylor, Clarence Hobart and Edward L. Hall.

References

Defunct tennis tournaments in the United States
Montclair, New Jersey